Pinkhus Grigorievich Turjan (Russian: Пинхус Григорьевич Турьян) the party organizer of the 269th separate sapper battalion in the 12 Army on the Southwestern Front. He was awarded the title Hero of the Soviet Union for his role in the Dnieper crossing.

Biography 
He was born in Lebedin, Ukraine in a working class Jewish family. He graduated 7 classes becoming a member of CPSU in 1918. Prior to joining the army forces he occupied administrative positions in the Kiev area. Joins the army in July 1941. During the crossing of the Dnieper river on 26–28 September 1943 in the district of the village of Petro-Svistunov he led the crossing of the 269th battalion of the 12th Army of the Soviet Union on the ferries, participating in battles for the bridgeheads and repelling counterattacks. After the war he lived in Kiev working in construction management.

Awards 
By decree of the Presidium of the Supreme Soviet on 19 March 1944 for his courage and heroism in crossing the Dnieper River captain he was awarded the title Hero of the Soviet Union and the Order of Lenin. His name is recorded at the Ukrainian Museum of the Great Patriotic War.

References 

1896 births
1976 deaths
Communist Party of the Soviet Union members
Heroes of the Soviet Union
Military personnel from Kyiv
Recipients of the Order of Lenin
Russian people of World War II
Soviet Army officers
Soviet military personnel of World War II
Soviet Jews in the military